Theophilea subcylindricollis is a species of beetle in the family Cerambycidae. It was described by Hladil in 1988.

References

Agapanthiini
Beetles described in 1988